Ganjarud (also Romanized as Ganjārūd) is a village in Reza Mahalleh Rural District, in the Central District of Rudsar County, Gilan Province, Iran. At the 2006 census, its population was 140, in 43 families.

References 

Populated places in Rudsar County